Officer is a 2018 Indian Telugu-language action film produced and directed by Ram Gopal Varma on his R Company Production banner. The film stars Nagarjuna Akkineni, Myra Sareen in the lead roles and music composed by Ravi Shankar. The Tamil dubbed version, Simtaangaran was released on 1 January 2021.

Plot
Sivaji Rao is a Hyderabad-based IPS officer who is posted as an SIT officer in Mumbai to handle the case of a corrupted cop called Narayan Pasari. Sivaji successfully manages to arrest Pasari, but the latter uses his influence, comes out of jail, and joins back in his duty. This time, he becomes even more lethal and starts targeting Sivaji. The end.

Cast
 Nagarjuna Akkineni as Sivaji Rao
 Myra Sareen as Meena Narang  
 Anwar Khan as Narayan Pasari
 Sayaji Shinde as JCP Ramdas
 Ajay as Prasad
 Srikanth Iyengar  as Bajrangi
 Ankur Ratan as John
 Baby Kavya as Shaalu
 Vizag Prasad as Producer (cameo appearance)

Production
The film shooting started on 20 November 2017 at the Annapurna Studios, Hyderabad. Nagarjuna & Ram Gopal Varma are pairing up almost after 25 years, this is the fifth film in their combination, their previous works being Siva (1989), Shiva (1990), Antham/Drohi (1992) and Govinda Govinda (1994). The motion poster of the film released on 28 February 2018 and its teaser was released on 9 April 2018. The second teaser released on 4 May while the theatrical trailer released on 12 May.

Soundtrack

Music composed by Ravi Shankar. Lyrics were written by Sira Sri. The music was released on Mango Music Company.

References

External links
 

2018 action thriller films
2018 crime action films
Indian action thriller films
Indian crime action films
Indian avant-garde and experimental films
Fictional portrayals of the Maharashtra Police
Films directed by Ram Gopal Varma
2010s Telugu-language films
Fictional portrayals of the Telangana Police
2010s avant-garde and experimental films